Markus Pommer (born 27 January 1991) is a German racing driver.

Career
Born in Heilbronn, Pommer began his racing career in karting 1999. He remained in karting until 2006. Amongst others he won 2004 the Southern German ADAC Kart Cup – ICA Junior. 2007 he began his formula racing career. He competed in the Formula BMW ADAC for Mücke Motorsport. He concluded the season behind his teammates Philipp Eng and Kevin Mirocha on the tenth position in the championship. After the fusion of the Formula BMW ADAC and the Formula BMW UK to the Formula BMW Europe, Pommer switched to Abt Sportsline in the ADAC Formel Masters 2008. Pommer won one race and finished five times on the podium. He finished the season in front of his teammate Daniel Abt on the fifth position in the championship.

In 2009 Pommer started in the German Formula Three Championship for Zettl Sportsline Motorsport. He won no races and scored two second place as his best results. He concluded the season behind Laurens Vanthoor and Stef Dusseldorp on the third position. Pommer was the best driver with an engine of Mercedes. In 2010 he remained in the German Formula Three Championship. He drove for Brandl Motorsport in this season. With a second place as his best result, he remains without a race win. He finished eighth in the championship and became the best driver with a Mercedes engine for the second time. In 2011 he competes his third season in the German Formula Three Championship. He started for Motopark Academy first. After he had scored only one point out of the first three rounds, he switched to Jo Zeller Racing. In his second race he already achieved the first podium position with a second place. After the fourth round he is on the tenth position in the championship.

Racing record

Career summary

Complete FIA Formula Two Championship results
(key) (Races in bold indicate pole position) (Races in italics indicate fastest lap)

Complete Porsche Supercup results
(key) (Races in bold indicate pole position) (Races in italics indicate fastest lap)

Complete Auto GP results
(key) (Races in bold indicate pole position) (Races in italics indicate fastest lap)

Complete FIA Formula 3 European Championship results
(key) (Races in bold indicate pole position) (Races in italics indicate fastest lap)

Complete Blancpain GT Series Sprint Cup results

Complete European Le Mans Series results
(key) (Races in bold indicate pole position; results in italics indicate fastest lap)

References

External links
 
 

1991 births
Living people
Sportspeople from Heilbronn
Racing drivers from Baden-Württemberg
German racing drivers
Formula BMW ADAC drivers
ADAC Formel Masters drivers
German Formula Three Championship drivers
FIA Formula Two Championship drivers
Porsche Supercup drivers
Auto GP drivers
FIA Formula 3 European Championship drivers
ADAC GT Masters drivers
24H Series drivers
European Le Mans Series drivers
Mücke Motorsport drivers
Abt Sportsline drivers
Motopark Academy drivers
Walter Lechner Racing drivers
Phoenix Racing drivers
Jo Zeller Racing drivers
Audi Sport drivers
Super Nova Racing drivers
Le Mans Cup drivers